Stanley Park is one of a collection of drama pilot episodes produced for BBC Three and was broadcast on 10 June 2010. The story focuses on a group of young friends going through a life-changing period of their lives. The episode was produced by 6 Degree Media and was written by Leo Richardson and inspired by his stage play.

Characters

Production
Stanley Park is the second of a series of three pilot episodes that were broadcast on BBC Three, the others being Pulse and Dappers.

Filming locations
The show is filmed in Cardiff, but set in Croydon.

External links
 Official Website
 
 
Stanley park writer introduces the Carrie Bradshaw of Croydon

2010 British television series debuts
British comedy-drama television shows
British teen drama television series
Youth culture in the United Kingdom